The Kosovo national football team represents Kosovo in men's international football. The team is controlled by the Football Federation of Kosovo, the governing body for football in Kosovo, and is under the jurisdiction of FIFA globally.

History

Pre-independence

First ever match
On 29 November 1942, Kosovo for first time in its history played a friendly match as part of the celebrations for 30th Anniversary of the Independence of Albania against Tirana and the match ended with a 2–0 away defeat and the starting line-up of that match was Mustafa Daci (GK), Ballanca, Ahmet Zaimi, Mazllum Xërxa, Veseli, Hajdar Hamza, Nebil Dylatahu, Ramadan Vraniqi, Dobrica Barbaroga, Bajrami and Henci.

Yugoslav era

On 8 November 1967, Kosovo for first time as autonomous province of SFR Yugoslavia played a friendly match against Yugoslavia and the match ended with a 3–3 home draw and the starting line-up of that match was a mix between Albanian and Serbian players as Milosavlević, Stevanović, Mušikić, Abrashi, S. Džukić, V. Džukić, Brovina, Hatibi, Radović, Prekazi and Pindović, for Yugoslavia this match it was a pre-preparation before the UEFA Euro 1968 qualifying match against Albania.

As part of Yugoslavia national team

Yugoslav squads at international competitions often included players from Kosovo, such as Fadil Vokrri and Stevan Stojanović. Three other footballers from Kosovo, Fahrudin Jusufi, Milutin Šoškić and Vladimir Durković, were part of the Yugoslav team that won the gold medal at the 1960 Summer Olympics and silver medal at the 1960 European Nations' Cup.

After breakup of Yugoslavia
On 20 January 1993, The Football Federation of Kosovo signed a cooperation protocol with the Albanian Football Association and in the framework of this protocol it was decided to play on 14 February a friendly match between Albania and Kosovo, which was the first match of Kosovo following the breakup of Yugoslavia, and this match ended with a 1–3 defeat and the starting line-up of that match was Ahmet Beselica (GK), Ardian Kozniku, Bardhec Seferi, Fadil Berisha, Gani Llapashtica, Genc Hoxha, Isa Sadriu, Kushtrim Munishi, Muharrem Sahiti, Sadullah Ajeti and Selajdin Jerliu.

After Kosovo War

On 7 September 2002, Kosovo for first time after the Kosovo War played a friendly match against Albania and the match ended with a 0–1 home minimal defeat and the starting line-up of that match was Ahmet Beselica (GK), Ardian Kozniku, Arsim Abazi, Besnik Kollari, Fadil Ademi, Faruk Statovci, Ismet Munishi, Mehmet Dragusha, Sunaj Keqi, Xhevdet Llumnica and Zenun Selimi.

One of the most important international matches was a 1–0 win over Saudi Arabia played on 15 June 2007. It was the first time that Kosovo played against a team that has taken part in the FIFA World Cup and the winning goal was scored by Kristian Nushi from the penalty kick on the 84th minute. On 22 April 2006, Kosovo achieved their biggest win, defeating Monaco 7–1. If one included matches played before Kosovo became a FIFA member, this scoreline is their best result yet.

After independence

First match
On 17 February 2010, for the first time since its declaration of independence, Kosovo played a friendly match against Albania (the match ended with a 2–3 home defeat for Kosovo). The starting line-up of that match was Kushtrim Mushica (GK), Anel Rashkaj, Dukagjin Gashi, Enis Zabërgja, Fisnik Papuçi, Ilir Nallbani, Liridon Kukaj, Robert Gjeraj, Shpëtim Hasani and Yll Hoxha. This match had a charity character as the profits gathered from this meeting went to those affected by floods in Shkodër.

Efforts for internationalization
On 6 May 2008, after its declaration of independence from Serbia, Kosovo applied for FIFA membership. On 24 October 2008, Kosovo's application was discussed at the FIFA Congress in Zürich and Kosovo's bid was rejected. At the occasion, FIFA's determined Kosovo could not even play friendly matches against FIFA members' national teams.

In September 2012, Albania international Lorik Cana, along with Swiss internationals Granit Xhaka, Valon Behrami and Xherdan Shaqiri, all of them with Kosovo Albanian origin, wrote a declaration to FIFA President Sepp Blatter, asking him to allow Kosovo to play friendly matches. The declaration was also signed by eight other Albanian footballers hailing from Kosovo as Ahmed Januzi, Alban Meha, Armend Dallku, Burim Kukeli, Etrit Berisha, Fatmire Bajramaj, Lorik Cana, Mërgim Mavraj and Samir Ujkani. Some players, especially Kosovo Serbs as Milan Biševac and Miloš Krasić, continued to play for Serbia.

Permission by FIFA to play friendlies

On 6 February 2013, FIFA decided to allow Kosovan club teams to play friendly games against clubs from countries whose national teams were members of FIFA. However, it was stipulated that Kosovan clubs and teams could not display national symbols such as the Kosovan flag, emblem, etc., or play the Kosovan anthem.

On 5 March 2014, the Kosovan football team was finally allowed by FIFA to play its first international friendly match, against Haiti; the match ended in a 0–0 draw. Before the match, some players of Kosovo posed with guns at a shooting range, causing a stir in Serbia. On the eve of the match, supporters of Kosovo burned the flag of Serbia. This incident prompted the Football Association of Serbia to request that FIFA revoked Kosovo's right to play international friendlies.

After the match against Haiti, six more matches were held in 2014, against Turkey, Senegal, Oman, Equatorial Guinea and Albania. The first win in these friendlies was against Oman, by 1–0, while the biggest defeat a 1–6 against Turkey.

Membership in UEFA and FIFA

In September 2015, at an UEFA Executive Committee meeting in Malta, the request from Kosovo for admission in UEFA was scheduled for deliberation in the next Ordinary Congress, to be held in Budapest. On 3 May 2016, at the Ordinary Congress, Kosovo was accepted into UEFA after members voted 28–24 in favor of Kosovo. Ten days later, Kosovo was accepted in FIFA during their 66th Congress in Mexico, with 141 votes in favour and 23 against.

First tournament

Debut in World Cup qualification and nearly successful first Euro attempt
Kosovo began to make their debut in the 2018 FIFA World Cup qualification, where Kosovo was assigned with Croatia, Finland, Iceland, Turkey and Ukraine. The Kosovars created its first major surprise, holding host Finland to a 1–1 draw, but it turned to be the lone point of Kosovo in the qualification, as the team lost the remaining games and finished last.

Following the failure to qualify for 2018 FIFA World Cup, Kosovo participated in the 2018–19 UEFA Nations League D sharing group with Azerbaijan, Faroe Islands and Malta, where the Kosovars topped their group undefeated to reach the country's first-ever play-offs in its attempt to qualify for UEFA Euro 2020. After the successful Nations League, Kosovo entered the UEFA Euro 2020 qualifying, where they shared group A with Bulgaria, Czech Republic, Montenegro and 2018 World Cup fourth place finisher England. As the dark horse of the qualification, Kosovo however created a major phenomenon, managed to beat Bulgaria, Montenegro and especially, a shock home win over the Czechs to take the second place behind England, being 15 matches and on that time nearly two years without defeat winning 11 of these 15 matches. The game against England away even saw the Kosovars took an early lead in the surprise, even though they were unable to protect it and fell 3–5 away, ending the longest unbeaten run in the football history of Kosovo. In the decisive match against the Czechs away, which Kosovo needed a win to directly qualify for the first time, Kosovo gained a shock lead, but failed to protect it again as they lost 1–2 and could only participate in the play-off, but this remained to be Kosovo's greatest success up to date.

Setback
After successfully obtained a play-off position, Kosovo headed to the 2020–21 UEFA Nations League C, being drawn with Greece, Moldova and Slovenia. After impressive performance in the UEFA Euro 2020 qualifying, Kosovo was tipped favorably to promote to League B. Yet, Kosovo began the Nations League with a disappointing 1–1 away draw to Moldova, before the team which was halved due to the absences of key players suffered a 1–2 home loss against Greece.

In Kosovo's first ever competitive UEFA Euro play-offs, Kosovo was drawn against North Macedonia. However, Kosovo was eliminated after losing 1–2 to the Macedonians in Skopje. After the elimination in the play-off's semifinals, the Kosovo's setback continues and the year 2020 was ended six losses, two draws and a victory in the last match of the year against Moldova, a victory which secured the attitude even for another season in the League C of the UEFA Nations League.

Team image

Nicknames
The Kosovo national football team has been known or nicknamed as the "Dardanët" ("Dardanians"). In addition to the official nickname, the Kosovo national team had different nicknames in different periods as:
"Shqipëria B" ("Albania B") — During the period before 2016, the national teams of Kosovo and Albania have exchanged players with each other, which influenced these two teams to be nicknamed reserve (B) teams of each other, the Kosovo national team was nicknamed Albania B due to many players came to play for Kosovo as they had no space to play for Albania, but the same thing happened with the Albanian national team which was nicknamed Kosovo B due to of the large number of players of Kosovo Albanian descent in its composition.
"Ekipi i Kosovës" ("Team Kosovo") — The Kosovo national team during the 2009–10 period was introduced with the nickname that was used as an alternative name in order to avoid possible sanctions by UEFA and FIFA against Kosovo and the opponents that Kosovo played. After Kosovo was allowed on 6 February 2013 by FIFA to play against FIFA member associations in international friendlies, this alternative name was no longer used.
"Brazili i Ballkanit" ("Brazil of the Balkans") — The Kosovo national team was nicknamed the Brazil of the Balkans during their fifteen-match unbeaten run during the 2018–19 season.

Kits and crest

The Kosovo kit has been mostly red and black before declaration of independence with few changes throughout the years and after the independence the kits are mostly blue and yellow. On 5 October 2016, Kosovo signed with Spanish sportswear company Kelme to a four-year contract and was the first official kit suppliers of Kosovo after membership in UEFA and FIFA. On 23 February 2022, Kosovo signed with Italian sportswear company Erreà to a three-year contract for it to the kit suppliers of Kosovo.

Kit sponsorship

Home stadium

Kosovo's home stadium is the Fadil Vokrri Stadium. The stadium capacity is 13,500, which makes it the second largest national stadium in Kosovo. Kosovo's previous national stadium was the Adem Jashari Olympic Stadium which is currently under renovation. Kosovo also used Loro Boriçi Stadium during the 2018 FIFA World Cup qualifying campaign, and this happened after the two stadiums in Pristina and Mitrovica at that time were under renovation and do not meet UEFA standards. On 12 July 2019, the construction of Kosovo National Stadium began, and two days later the project of this stadium was presented which would have a capacity of 30,000 seats, but after the presentation, the construction was suspended for political reasons related to the location.

Rivalries

Albania

This derby is otherwise known as Brotherly derby, also known as the Brotherly. The documented beginnings of this derby date back to the time during the World War II, respectively on 29 November 1942, where they played a friendly match as part of the celebrations for 30th Anniversary of the Independence of Albania and the match ended with a 2–0 win for Tirana, this derby is back 50 years after the first match, when the Football Federation of Kosovo signed a cooperation protocol with the Albanian Football Association and in the framework of this protocol it was decided to play on 14 February a friendly match between these two national teams, and this match ended with a 3–1 win for Albania.

Media coverage

Current

Previous

Fixtures and results

2022

2023

Coaching staff

Current coaching staff

Manager history

Players

Current squad
The following players were called up for the UEFA Euro 2024 qualifying matches against Israel and Andorra, on 25 and 28 March 2023.
Caps and goals are correct as of 19 November 2022 after the match against Faroe Islands.

Recent call-ups
The following players have been called up for the team within the last 12 months and are still available for selection.

Notes
INJ = Not part of the current squad due to injury.
PRE = Preliminary squad/standby.
U21 = Was called up from national U21 squad.

Records

Players in bold are still active with Kosovo.

Most capped players

Top goalscorers

Captains

Competitive record

FIFA World Cup
On 9 June 2016, the UEFA Emergency Panel decided that Kosovo would join Croatia, Finland, Iceland, Turkey and Ukraine in Group I, and also decided that Bosnia and Herzegovina and Serbia should not play against Kosovo for security reasons. On 5 September 2016, Kosovo made its debut in the FIFA World Cup qualifications with a 1–1 away draw against Finland, with Kosovo's equalizing goal being scored by the newcomer Valon Berisha from a penalty kick in the 60th minute. On 2 September 2021, Kosovo achieved their first win in the FIFA World Cup qualifications a 1–0 away win against Georgia.

UEFA European Championship
On 2 December 2018, in Dublin, it was decided that Kosovo should be part in Group A of the UEFA Euro 2020 qualifying, together with Bulgaria, Czech Republic, Montenegro and 2018 World Cup fourth place finisher England. On 25 March 2019, Kosovo made their debut on UEFA European Championship qualifying with a 1–1 home draw against Bulgaria and the draw goal was scored by Arbër Zeneli on the 61st minute. On 11 June 2019, Kosovo won their first ever qualifying match for a major tournament by defeating Bulgaria 3–2.

UEFA Nations League

On 24 January 2018, in Lausanne, it was decided that Kosovo should be part of League D in Group 3 of the 2018–19 UEFA Nations League, together with Azerbaijan, Faroe Islands and Malta. On 7 September 2018, Kosovo made their debut in the UEFA Nations League with a 0–0 away draw against Azerbaijan. On 10 September 2018, Kosovo achieved their first win in the UEFA Nations League, which was also the team's first-ever competitive win, a 2–0 home win against the Faroe Islands. Kosovo finished the league unbeaten (with four wins and two draws) and will be promoted to the next tier (C league) for the next edition.

Non-FIFA Tournament
Kosovo for first time after the Kosovo War participated in a tournament held to celebrate the 50th anniversary of the Cyprus Turkish Football Association. Kosovo lost against the host with result 1–0 and won against Sàpmi with result 4–1.

FIFA ranking history

 Best ranking  Worst ranking  Best mover  Worst mover

Head-to-head record

See also
Men's
Under-21
Under-19
Under-17
Under-15
Futsal
Women's
National team
Under-19
Under-17

Notes and references

Notes

References

External links

 
Kosovo at National-Football-Teams.com
Kosovo at RSSSF

 
European national association football teams